Joan Leslie Freeman is a retired American actress.

Biography
Freeman was born in Council Bluffs, Iowa. She attended Mother Cabrini School in Burbank, California, and later attended John Burroughs High School where she graduated in 1959. 

Freeman started as a child actor, having appeared at the age of 7 in the 1949 television series Sandy Dreams, along with Richard Beymer and Jill St. John. Her first film role was in Pistol Harvest (1951), where she had a small part playing the lead actress' character as a child. At fourteen, she played the character Jeannie Harlow in the 1956 episode "The Frontier Theatre" of the ABC western series, The Life and Legend of Wyatt Earp, with Hugh O'Brian in the title role.

In 1961–62, Freeman was cast in 26 episodes as the young waitress Elma Gahrigner, in the ABC drama series Bus Stop, in a role that gave her some prominence. After Bus Stop, she appeared in guest-starring roles on the NBC modern western series, Empire, with Richard Egan and on the ABC/Warner Brothers western, The Dakotas.. She also played defendant Jennifer Wakely in Perry Mason's, "The Case of the Fickle Filly" in 1962.

In 1962, Freeman was cast as Marilyn Hayes in the post-atomic war black-and-white classic film Panic in Year Zero! alongside veteran film stars Ray Milland and Jean Hagen.  Alabama newspaper The Anniston Star described Freeman as "lovely" in the part.

Also in 1962, she appeared in the quasi-historical film Tower of London with Vincent Price.  Her work to that point was enough to gain her a Photoplay Gold Medal nomination from Photoplay film magazine as Most Promising New Star (Female).  That was followed up by being named as a Hollywood Deb Star in 1963.

In 1963, Freeman was cast as American tourist Amelia Carter in The Three Stooges Go Around the World in a Daze.

In 1964, Freeman played the role of Elizabeth Dunn secretary to Dr. James Stone in the episode "Behold Eck" in the TV series The Outer Limits. She co-starred in The Rounders, a 1965 comedy film based on the novel of the same name by Max Evans.

Freeman is perhaps best known for her roles in two musical films. In 1964, she was the love interest of Elvis Presley in Roustabout.  There she played the "good girl" pursuing Elvis and competing against a vixen type played by  Sue Ane Langdon, all the while being stuck in arguments with her father, a bitter carnival hand played by Leif Erickson.  Variety magazine said that "Miss Freeman hasn't much to do except wring her hands ... but does it prettily."  In 1964 Freeman received a Photoplay Gold Medal nomination for Best Female Star.

The other such role was in 1967, when she appeared with Roy Orbison in The Fastest Guitar Alive. In 1967, she appeared as the love interest opposite Don Knotts in the Cold War space-race comedy The Reluctant Astronaut.

In 1977, Freeman costarred as Barbara Robinson in the 13-episode CBS series Code R about the emergency fire, police, and ocean rescue services in the California Channel Islands. Tom Simcox played her police chief husband.

Freeman also made a number of guest appearances on different television shows from the 1950s through the 1980s including National Velvet, Family Affair, Gunsmoke, Wagon Train, and Bonanza.

In 1966, Freeman guest starred on The Man From U.N.C.L.E. in "The Bat Cave Affair". She appeared four times on the NBC western series The Virginian. Her last motion picture performance came as "Mrs. Jarvis" in the 1984 horror film, Friday the 13th: The Final Chapter. In 1994, Freeman appeared as an actress for the last time in an episode of the TV series Renegade.

Filmography

Pistol Harvest (1951) - Felice as a Child
Trouble Along the Way (1953) - Minor Role (uncredited)
Teenage Rebel (1956) - Teenager in Malt Shop (uncredited)
The Remarkable Mr. Pennypacker (1959) - Mary Pennypacker (uncredited)
Come September (1961) - Linda
Panic in Year Zero! (1962) - Marilyn Hayes
Tower of London (1962) - Lady Margaret
The Three Stooges Go Around the World in a Daze (1963) - Amelia Carter
Roustabout (1964) - Cathy Lean
The Rounders (1965) - Meg Moore
The Reluctant Astronaut (1967) - Ellie Jackson
The Fastest Guitar Alive (1967) - Sue Chesnut
Warhead (1977) - Namoi
Jinxed! (1982) - Woman Agent
Friday the 13th: The Final Chapter (1984) - Mrs. Jarvis

References

External links
 

American child actresses
American film actresses
American television actresses
Actresses from Iowa
Living people
People from Council Bluffs, Iowa
Actresses from Los Angeles
20th-century American actresses
21st-century American women
Year of birth missing (living people)